Christopher Mott is an American academic who was a National Football Foundation Hall of Fame Scholar-Athlete in 1978  and Pacific-10 Conference Medalist in 1979  for the Arizona State Sun Devils. He is currently a Senior Continuing Lecturer in the department of English at the University of California, Los Angeles.

Background
Mott attended Arizona State University where he played for the Sun Devils football team, serving as co-captain in 1977. He received his B.A. in English Education from ASU in 1979 and his Ph.D. in English from the University of California, Los Angeles in 1991.

Awards and honors
 Honorary member of the Golden Key International Honour Society, UCLA
 1995:Distinguished Lecturer Award, UCLA
 1979: Pacific-10 Conference Medalist, Arizona State Sun Devils
 1978:National Football Foundation Hall of Fame Scholar-Athlete, Arizona State Sun Devils

Selected publications and talks
 "Electronic Literature Pedagogy: A Questionable Approach." In Electronic Literature: New Horizons for the Literary: Supplemental Online Essays, N. Katherine Hayles, 2008.
 "The Art of Self-Promotion: Or, Which Self to Sell? The Proliferation and Disintegration of the Harlem Renaissance." In Dettmar, Kevin J. H. (ed. and introd.); Watt, Stephen (ed. and introd.). Marketing Modernisms: Self-Promotion, Canonization, Rereading. Ann Arbor, MI: U of Michigan, 1996: 253-74.
 "The Cummings Line on Race." Spring: The Journal of the E. E. Cummings Society, vol. 4, pp. 71–75, Fall 1995.
 "Libra and the Subject of History." Critique: Studies in Contemporary Fiction, vol. 35, no. 3, pp. 131–45, Spring 1994

Book reviews
 "Hints and Guesses: William Gaddis's Fiction of Longing." Critique: Studies in Contemporary Fiction, September, 1999.
 "Blank Fictions: Consumerism, Culture and the Contemporary American Novel." Critique: Studies in Contemporary Fiction, September, 1999.
 "Don DeLillo. Critique: Studies in Contemporary Fiction,  June, 1994.

New Media talks
 "Customizing an Instructional Application." Scholarship in a New Media Environment: Issues and Trends. UCLA OID, 1999.
 "The Workload and the Web. Scholarship in a New Media Environment: Issues and Trends. UCLA OID, 1998.

Further reading
 Eshoff, Ryan. "Athletes are not without intellect, and UCLA students should avoid stereotypes that paint them as uninterested in or unfit for academics." Daily Bruin, May 25, 2011.

Notes

External links
 Official site

University of California, Los Angeles faculty
University of California, Los Angeles alumni
Arizona State University alumni
Arizona State Sun Devils football players
Year of birth missing (living people)
Living people